Songdo Moonlight Festival Park is a park in Songdo-dong, Yeonsu-gu, Incheon, South Korea.

Notable events

Festivals
Various cultural festivals came to be held at the festival park.
 Pentaport Rock Festival
 Songdo Beer Festival

Concerts
 2019
 Ed Sheeran: ÷ Tour

References

Parks in Incheon
Yeonsu District
Songdo International Business District
Music venues in South Korea